25th London Film Critics Circle Awards
9 February 2005

Film of the Year: 
 Sideways 

British Film of the Year: 
 Vera Drake 

The 25th London Film Critics Circle Awards, honouring the best in film for 2004, were announced by the London Film Critics Circle on 9 February 2005.

Winners and nominees

Film of the Year
 Sideways 
The Aviator
Eternal Sunshine of the Spotless Mind
House of Flying Daggers
The Motorcycle Diaries

British Film of the Year
 Vera Drake 
Finding Neverland
Ae Fond Kiss...
My Summer of Love
Shaun of the Dead

Foreign Language Film of the Year
 The Motorcycle Diaries • Argentina
Bad Education • Spain
House of Flying Daggers • China/Hong Kong
The Return • Russia
A Very Long Engagement • France

Director of the Year
 Martin Scorsese – The Aviator 
Michel Gondry – Eternal Sunshine of the Spotless Mind
Alexander Payne – Sideways
Walter Salles – The Motorcycle Diaries
Zhang Yimou – House of Flying Daggers

British Director of the Year
 Mike Leigh – Vera Drake 
Paul Greengrass – The Bourne Supremacy
Shane Meadows – Dead Man's Shoes
Pawel Pawlikowski – My Summer of Love
Michael Radford – The Merchant of Venice

Screenwriter of the Year
 Charlie Kaufman – Eternal Sunshine of the Spotless Mind 
David Magee – Finding Neverland
Brad Bird – The Incredibles
Jean-Pierre Bacri and Agnes Jaoui – Look at Me
Alexander Payne and Jim Taylor – Sideways

British Screenwriter of the Year
Mike Leigh – Vera Drake 
Joe Penhall – Enduring Love
Paul Laverty – Ae Fond Kiss...
Pawel Pawlikowski and Michael Wynne – My Summer of Love
Simon Pegg and Edgar Wright – Shaun of the Dead

Actor of the Year
 Jamie Foxx – Ray 
Johnny Depp – Finding Neverland
Leonardo DiCaprio – The Aviator
Paul Giamatti – Sideways
Geoffrey Rush – The Life and Death of Peter Sellers

Actress of the Year
 Imelda Staunton – Vera Drake 
Annette Bening – Being Julia
Nicole Kidman – Birth
Natalie Portman – Closer
Charlize Theron – Monster

British Actor of the Year
Daniel Craig – Enduring Love 
Paddy Considine – Dead Man's Shoes
Ben Kingsley – House of Sand and Fog
James McAvoy – Inside I'm Dancing
Clive Owen – Closer

British Actress of the Year
Eva Birthistle – Ae Fond Kiss...  
Kate Winslet – Eternal Sunshine of the Spotless Mind 
Judi Dench – Ladies in Lavender
Emily Mortimer – Dear Frankie
Natalie Press – My Summer of Love

British Supporting Actor of the Year
Phil Davis – Vera Drake 
Brian Cox – Troy
Rupert Everett – Stage Beauty
Eddie Marsan – Vera Drake
Alfred Molina – Spider-Man 2

British Supporting Actress of the Year
Romola Garai – Inside I'm Dancing 
Eileen Atkins – Vanity Fair Minnie Driver – The Phantom of the Opera
Ruth Sheen – Vera Drake
Emily Woof – Wondrous Oblivion

British Newcomer of the YearNatalie Press – My Summer of Love 'Amma Asante – A Way of LifeEva Birthistle – Ae Fond Kiss...Emily Blunt – My Summer of LoveFreddie Highmore – Finding Neverland''

25th Silver Anniversary Award
Norma Heyman

Dilys Powell Award
Ken Loach

References

2
2004 film awards
2004 in London
2004 in British cinema